James McColl Dickson (1854 – 16 March 1937) was a Reform Party Member of Parliament in New Zealand.

Dickson was born in Victoria in 1854. He came to Otago as a nine-year-old and continued his schooling there. Together with his brother, he was for many years a sawmiller. He then had a farm at Portobello for the next 40 years breeding stock.

Dickson was a member of the Portobello School Committee. In 1911, he was voted onto the Otago Harbour Board and served for three terms as chairman. He won the Chalmers electorate in the 1914 general election, and held it to 1928, when he retired.

Dickson's wife died before him. Dickson lived at his son-in-law's place in the Dunedin suburb of Roslyn when he died on 16 March 1937. He was survived by three sons and two daughters.

References

Reform Party (New Zealand) MPs
1854 births
1937 deaths
New Zealand MPs for Dunedin electorates
Members of the New Zealand House of Representatives
Unsuccessful candidates in the 1911 New Zealand general election